The  is a Japanese literary award given by publishing company Kawade Shobō Shinsha. It was first awarded in 1962. The award is intended to recognize new writers, and several famous Japanese writers have won the award, but many Bungei Prize winners have not achieved any further literary recognition.

Notable winners
Kawade Shobō Shinsha maintains a complete official list of winning works.

See also
 List of Japanese literary awards

References

External links 
  

1962 establishments in Japan
Japanese literary awards
Awards established in 1962